Khakhyap Dorjé, 15th Karmapa Lama (1871–1922 or 1870–1921) was born in Sheikor village in Tsang, Tibet. It's said at birth he spoke the Chenrezig mantra, and at five he was able to read scriptures. He was recognized as the Karmapa reincarnation and enthroned at 6 by the ninth Kyabgon Drukchen. 

Khakhyap Dorjé had at least 5 consorts and two of his sons were known great tulkus. The 15th Karmapa had numerous sons and daughters, and they were instrumental in reviving several eastern Tibetan transmission lineages that were at risk of dying out.

Education
Khakhyap Dorjé received the Kagyu transmission from Jamgon Kongtrul, including the instructions of the Five Treasures that Kongtrul had compiled in over one hundred volumes, teachings and practices from the Rimé movement. Trashi Özer and other masters completed his education.

Life and legacy
In 1898 Khakhyap Dorjé travelled to Bhutan where he bestowed many transmissions. On his return to Tibet, he took several consorts. Female wisdom and inspiration are necessary to find the hidden teachings of Guru Rinpoche and Yeshe Tsogyal known as termas. With few exceptions, a Tertön must have a consort. At the time of Guru Rinpoche, Karmapa was one of 25 of his main students, with the name Gyalwa Choyang.  Khakyab Dorje married Dāki Wangmo, bore three sons, one of whom, Khyentsé Özer, was recognised as the Second Jamgon Kongtrul  and another, Jamyang Rinpoché, an unrecognised Shamarpa (d. circa 1947). He composed a special text explaining how to return one's vows.

Among his closest students were the 11th Tai Situpa, whom Karmapa recognised as the Situpa reincarnation, Karma Jamyang Khyentsé Özer, and the First Beru Khyentse.

See also
Urgyen Tsomo

Footnotes

References

External links

Lifestory of the 15th Karmapa on karmapa.org
"THE FIFTEENTH GYALWA KARMAPA, Khakhyab Dorje". 

1871 births
15
19th-century lamas
20th-century lamas
1922 deaths
19th-century Tibetan people
20th-century Tibetan people